Jane Hamilton (born 1957) is an American novelist.

Jane Hamilton may also refer to:
 Jane Hamilton (actress) (1915–2004), American film actress
 Jane Hamilton (British noblewoman) (died 1753), British noblewoman
 Jane Eaton Hamilton (born 1954), Canadian short story writer, poet and photographer
 Jane Soley Hamilton (1805–1897), Canadian pioneer midwife
 Veronica Hart (Jane Esther Hamilton, born 1956), American former pornographic actress
 Jane Hamilton-Merritt American photojournalist